Shohei Yokoyama (横山 翔平, born August 9, 1993) is a Japanese football player who plays as a midfielder or a winger.

Having started his career in Japan, Yokoyama moved to Croatia, joining fourth-tier NK Međimurec DP, spending a year and a half there, becoming the club's top scorer with 22 goals in the 2017/18 season. In 2018 he moved to Austrian third-tier team DSC Wonisch Installationen, but returned in December to Croatia, this time to second-tier Varaždin.

Club statistics
Updated to 23 February 2016.

References

External links

1993 births
Living people
Association football people from Gunma Prefecture
Japanese footballers
J2 League players
J3 League players
Thespakusatsu Gunma players
FC Machida Zelvia players
NK Varaždin players
J.League U-22 Selection players
Association football midfielders